Kentucky Route 1447 (KY 1447) is a  state highway in the U.S. State of Kentucky. Its western terminus is at KY 1932 in Louisville and its eastern terminus is at KY 146.

History
Although the Kentucky General Assembly considered plans for an interchange with I-264 as early as 1992, work did not begin until October 2008 and was completed in May 2010.

Major junctions

References

1447
1447
Transportation in Louisville, Kentucky